William Segar Archer (March 5, 1789March 28, 1855) was a slave owner, politician, planter and lawyer from Amelia County, Virginia who served several times in the Virginia House of Delegates, as well as in the United States House of Representatives and the United States Senate (1841 to 1847).

Early and family life
Born at "The Lodge" (a/k/a "Red Lodge") in Amelia County, Virginia to the former Elizabeth Eggleston (d. 1826) and her husband John Archer (1746-1812), William Segar Archer received a private education appropriate to his class and graduated from The College of William & Mary in 1806. His father (as well as his younger brother) died in 1812. Meanwhile, Archer read law, possibly with his uncle Joseph Eggleston (1754-1811), a former Revolutionary War soldier from Middlesex County, who then moved to Amelia County, where he became a planter and politician, and the local justice of the peace. Another Revolutionary War soldier uncle who moved to Amelia County was Lt. Richard Tanner Archer.

William Segar Archer married and had a daughter, who did not survive him. At his death, he was survived by several sisters, and an illegitimate son.

Career

Admitted to the bar in 1810, Archer began a private legal practice in Amelia and neighboring Powhatan Counties. He also operated a plantation in Amelia County using enslaved labor. In the 1820 federal census, John R. Archer (possibly his father, although he had died in 1812) owned 51 enslaved people, and William S. Archer owned 32 slaves. In the 1830 federal census, William S. Archer owned 25 enslaved people, which number grew to 50 enslaved people by the 1840 federal census, and 68 enslaved people in the 1850 U.S. Federal Census. By his death, Archer owned 88 enslaved individuals, and land both in Amelia County and in Mississippi.

Four times Archer won election to represent Amelia County (part time) as one of its two delegates in the Virginia House of Delegates between 1812 and 1819, although he also once failed to win re-election during that period. One historian reading his speeches considered his political stance undemocratic and noted that, despite his campaigns, Amelia County voters refused to elect him as one of their representatives to the Virginia constitutional conventions in 1829, nor in 1850.

Archer won election to the United States House of Representatives to fill the vacancy caused by the resignation of James Pleasants (whom the Virginia General Assembly had elected to the U.S. Senate). He had a conservative, states' rights bent and soon introduced a resolution denying that Congress had the constitutional authority to authorize the Bank of the United States. Archer won reelection in 1820, 1824, 1826, 1828, 1830 and 1832, thus served from 1820 to 1835. In Congress, Archer rose to chairman of the Committee on Foreign Affairs from 1829 to 1835, before being defeated for reelection in 1834 by Democrat John Winston Jones. In 1824 Archer supported the unsuccessful Presidential candidacy of Virginia-born Democratic Republican William H. Crawford. In the next Presidential election, Archer supported Andrew Jackson, but broke with the Jacksonian Democrats after Jackson high-handedly removed government deposits from the Bank of the United States. Archer then joined the Whig Party, although he did not agree with its leader Henry Clay's support of internal improvement.

Whigs gained power in the Virginia General Assembly by 1840, and on the second ballot Archer was elected to the United States Senate over the incumbent, William H. Roane. Archer served one full term, from 1841 to 1847. There, he became chairman of the Committee on Foreign Relations from 1841 to 1845 and of the Committee on Naval Affairs from 1841 to 1843. Issues of territorial expansion and slavery became important during his tenure. Archer supported President Polk's effort to end British claims to the Oregon Territory, but not the annexation of Texas (fearing it would lead to war with Mexico, as happened). Archer also became a key member of the committee who drafted the Missouri Compromise. However, he did not have enough support in the Virginia General Assembly to win reelection. Legislators elected Robert M. T. Hunter in 1846, over both Archer and then-Virginia governor and future Confederate general Extra Billy Smith.

Archer resumed his legal practice, as well as managed his plantations for the remaining near decade of his life. He also served as a trustee of Hampden-Sydney College from 1820 through 1839.

Death and legacy

Archer died at "The Lodge" in Amelia County on March 28, 1855. He was interred in the family cemetery there, and left his large estate, including 2000 acres of land and 2500 books, as well as enslaved people and other property, to his three sisters, who decided to split it into four parts and thus provide for Archer's illegitimate son, William Segar Archer Work. While his sister Elizabeth Archer died the following year, Martha Archer and Anna Barnes Archer survived the American Civil War. Neither was the mother of C.S.A. Lt. William Segar Archer Jr. (1843-1930) (who was actually the son of Chesterfield County merchant Peter Jefferson Archer and his wife Martha Michaux), who enlisted as a private in April 1861 and won promotions to ordinance sergeant and then lieutenant of the 48th Virginia Infantry before being captured at Winchester in September 1864 and ending his war in a federal prison in Delaware (and became a merchant in Richmond afterward).

Elections

1823; Archer was re-elected unopposed.
1825; Archer was re-elected unopposed.
1827; Archer was re-elected unopposed.
1829; Archer was re-elected unopposed.
1831; Archer was re-elected unopposed.
1833; Archer was re-elected unopposed.

References

External links

1789 births
1855 deaths
People from Amelia County, Virginia
American people of English descent
Democratic-Republican Party members of the United States House of Representatives from Virginia
Jacksonian members of the United States House of Representatives from Virginia
Whig Party United States senators from Virginia
Virginia Whigs
Chairmen of the Senate Committee on Foreign Relations
Members of the Virginia House of Delegates
Virginia lawyers
College of William & Mary alumni